Hans Jürgen Todt (born 6 July 1937) is a German modern pentathlete. He competed for West Germany at the 1968 Summer Olympics. Todt finished 46th, as he and his horse scored 0 points in the steeplechase. With the West German team he came in 13th. In 1966 and 1967 Todt won the West German national title. By profession, he was a type setter.

References

1937 births
Living people
German male modern pentathletes
Olympic modern pentathletes of West Germany
Modern pentathletes at the 1968 Summer Olympics
People from Świnoujście
People from the Province of Pomerania